Xiayuan station may refer to the following stations with different Chinese names:

 Xiayuan station (Guangzhou Metro) (夏园站), a station on Line 5 and Line 13 of the Guangzhou Metro.
 Xiayuan railway station (下元站), a station on Guangzhou–Shenzhen railway.